The 2015 Auburn Tigers football team represented Auburn University in the 2015 NCAA Division I FBS football season. The Tigers played their home games at Jordan–Hare Stadium in Auburn, Alabama and competed in the Western Division of the Southeastern Conference (SEC). They were led by third-year head coach Gus Malzahn. They finished the season 7–6, 2–6 in SEC play to finish in last place in the Western Division. They were invited to the Birmingham Bowl where they defeated Memphis.

Before the season

Previous season

With high expectations going into Gus Malzahn's second year on the plains after an SEC Championship and a National Championship berth in his first season, Auburn would race out to a 5–0 (2–0) record reaching a #2 ranking in the nation in the polls. However, the Tigers would suffer a defensive collapse in the latter half of the season in which the Tigers would surrender over 30 points in 7 of their last 8 games. The Tigers high scoring offense struggled to overcome these defensive woes which would end up causing them to drop 5 of those last 8 games on their way to a disappointing 8–5 (4–4) season.

This defensive collapse suffered by the Tigers would lead to the firing of Defensive Coordinator Ellis Johnson followed by the hiring of recently fired Florida head coach Will Muschamp. Muschamp would subsequently let go of assistant coaches Charlie Harbison and Melvin Smith and bring on former Auburn player and alum Travaris Robinson, who worked for him at Florida, and Lance Thompson from Alabama.

Departures

The Tigers would lose 18 seniors to graduation as well as 2 juniors who would choose to forgo their senior season in pursuit of an earlier NFL career. The Tigers would lose 12 more players from the 2014 team due to various reasons.

Returning starters

Returning players that started all or a significant number of games in the 2014 season.

Offense

Defense

Special teams

† Indicates player was a starter in 2013 but missed all of 2014 due to injury.

Recruiting class

The Tigers would go on to land another top 10 recruiting class in 2015 (#3 by Scout, #7 by Rivals, #7 by ESPN, and #9 by 247). The signing class was highlighted by Byron Cowart (DE)--widely considered the #1 recruit in the nation in the 2015 recruiting cycle. All of the players would qualify academically and enroll over the summer.

The Tigers would also add three transfer players: graduate student Blake Countess (CB) from Michigan who is able to play immediately, as well as Darius James (OL) from Texas and Jamel Dean (CB) from Ohio State, both of whom must sit out one year to satisfy the NCAA's transfer rule.

Spring game

The Tigers spring game 'A-Day' was held on Saturday April 18. Team Auburn defeated team Tigers 24–14 with wide receiver Myron Burton and safety Tray Matthews earning offensive and defensive MVP honors respectively. 62,143 fans attended the game making it the highest attended spring game of the year in which the fans had to pay to attend ($5), and the 4th most attended Auburn spring game after 2013, 2014, and 2010.

Personnel

Roster and staff

Depth chart
Official Depth Chart as of 9/1/2015

Schedule
Auburn announced their 2015 football schedule on October 14, 2014. The 2015 schedule consist of 7 home games and 4 away games in the regular season. One game is at a neutral site in Atlanta, Georgia against the Louisville Cardinals in the Chick-fil-A Kickoff Game on September 5. The Tigers will host SEC foes Alabama, Georgia, Mississippi State, and Ole Miss, and will travel to Arkansas, Kentucky, LSU, and Texas A&M, also the Tigers made it to the Birmingham Bowl which is played at Legion Field.

Game summaries

Louisville

It was announced on August 29, 2013 that Auburn and Louisville would meet in the Chick-fil-A Kickoff Game in 2015. In the game, Auburn started with an interception and scored in the first 2 minutes. Auburn jumped out to a 24–0 lead, but Louisville, led by Lamar Jackson came back. After an timeout for Louisville with around a minute to go, Auburn was able to run out the clock and win 31–24.

Jacksonville State

In their home opener, Auburn played Jacksonville State. This was the debut of Auburn's new jumbotron which is the biggest in college football.  In a game that many expected to be a blowout, Jacksonville State hung with Auburn and led at halftime.  With 39 seconds left in the ballgame and Jacksonville State leading 20–13, Melvin Ray caught a touchdown from Jeremy Johnson.  Jacksonville State got the ball back and took a knee, sending the game to overtime.  In overtime, Peyton Barber scored from four yards out putting Auburn ahead 27–20.  Jacksonville State got the ball and got it to the 5 yard line.  On 3rd Down and Goal, Cassanova McKinzy sacked Eli Jenkins setting up 4th Down and Goal.  Jenkins threw a pass to the end zone which was caught out of bounds, so it was incomplete and Auburn had escaped with a 27–20 win in overtime.

LSU

In the third game of the season, Auburn traveled to what is widely considered to be the toughest place to play in college football. They took on the LSU Tigers in the 50th meeting in the Tiger Bowl rivalry game. Leonard Fournette had a career game and LSU jumped out to a 24–0 lead en route to a 45–21 victory.  Auburn's record fell to 2–1.

Mississippi State

In the fourth game of the season, Auburn took on the Mississippi State Bulldogs. It was Sean White's first start as quarterback for Auburn. The offense and defense both looked improved from the last two weeks, but Auburn had to settle for field goals rather than touchdowns in the red zone. Miscues such as an interception, and a high snap, both in the red zone hurt Auburn's chances in the ballgame, and Mississippi State won 17–9.  It was the first time in the Gus Malzahn era at Auburn (including his time as offensive coordinator from 2009–2011) that Auburn had failed to score a touchdown.

San Jose State

Kentucky

After their only bye week, Auburn went to Lexington, Kentucky to face the Kentucky Wildcats on a Thursday night. It was a great game for both teams.  Kentucky had dropped passes and  threw an interception in the end zone which cost the Wildcats.  On the final, possible game-winning, drive for Kentucky, Auburn stopped them on 4th and 3 with almost 30 seconds left to win.

Arkansas

The seventh game of the season was against the Arkansas Razorbacks. In an exciting game, dropped passes hurt Auburn as the Tigers fell in 4 overtimes. Now the Tigers lead the all-time series 13–11–1.

Ole Miss

The eighth game of the season was against Ole Miss. Auburn struggled in the red zone and had to settle for field goals rather than touchdowns. Many people thought bad coaching and play calls contributed to the 27–19 loss. The Tigers now lead the series 29–11–0.

Texas A&M

The ninth contest of the season was a trip to Texas to face Texas A&M. Auburn had their best game of the season, according to head coach Gus Malzahn. The defense was especially great, forcing 3 turnovers, all interceptions, 2 of which were inside Auburn's 5 yard line. The win meant Auburn was 1 win away from bowl eligibility. Jeremy Johnson started in place of an injured Sean White, making his first start since the LSU game on September 19. The Aggies now lead the series 4–2–0.

Georgia

In the tenth game of the season, Auburn face off against rival Georgia. Auburn's passing game was not good in this ballgame.  The Tigers blew a 10–3 halftime lead, and lost 20–13.  A late Ricardo Louis fumble at the UGA 1 cost the Tigers greatly. The overall series record is 55–56–8.

Idaho

The eleventh game of the season was against the Idaho Vandals.  Behind Jeremy Johnson's 4 touchdowns, the offense put a season high 56 points on the scoreboard as they cruised to a 56–34 win.  The win gave the Tigers their 6th win of the season, giving them bowl eligibility.

Alabama

In the twelfth and final game of the regular season, Auburn will take on arch-rival Alabama. Their last meeting ended in a 55–44 loss for the Tigers in the 2014 season. Alabama leads the all-time series 43–35–1.

Memphis

((-))

Rankings

References

Auburn
Auburn Tigers football seasons
Birmingham Bowl champion seasons
Auburn Tigers football